Level 1 may refer to:

Technology and standards
 Level 1 (National Qualifications Framework)
 level 1 cache, a type of CPU cache (Computer Memory)
 A Level I trauma center
 Level 1, a level of automation in a self-driving car (see Autonomous car#Classification)
 Level I Environmental Site Assessment
 Biosafety level 1, a laboratory grade
 Level 1 market data

Companies
 Level 1 Entertainment, an American film production company
 Level One (company), a company providing networking products

Other uses 
 Level 1 coronavirus restrictions, see COVID-19 pandemic in Scotland#Levels System

 STANAG 4569 protection level